The 2022 Arcadia Women's Pro Open was a professional tennis tournament played on outdoor hard courts. It was the first edition of the tournament which was part of the 2022 ITF Women's World Tennis Tour. It took place in Arcadia, California, United States between 28 February and 6 March 2022.

Singles main-draw entrants

Seeds

 1 Rankings are as of 21 February 2022.

Other entrants
The following players received wildcards into the singles main draw:
  Katie Codd
  Liv Hovde
  Elvina Kalieva
  Raveena Kingsley

The following players received entry using protected rankings:
  Louisa Chirico
  Priscilla Hon

The following player received entry using a junior exempt:
  Linda Fruhvirtová

The following players received entry from the qualifying draw:
  Reese Brantmeier
  Kayla Day
  Ellie Douglas
  Quinn Gleason
  Ashlyn Krueger
  Maegan Manasse
  Robin Montgomery
  Ena Shibahara

Champions

Singles

  Rebecca Marino def.  Alycia Parks, 7–6(7–0), 6–1

Doubles

  Ashlyn Krueger /  Robin Montgomery def.  Harriet Dart /  Giuliana Olmos, walkover

References

External links
 2022 Arcadia Women's Pro Open at ITFtennis.com

2022 ITF Women's World Tennis Tour
2022 in American tennis
February 2022 sports events in the United States
March 2022 sports events in the United States
2022 in sports in California